Hemalatha,  often credited as Hema, is an Indian actress and dancer. She is acclaimed for her roles as Raghavi in the popular soap opera Kana Kaanum Kaalangal on STAR Vijay and as Deepa in the superhit Tamil drama serial on Sun TV Thendral. She was the winner of the reality dance show Jodi Number One in Season 3 along with Michael Thangadurai.

Career 
Hemalatha was born in Tamil family, started her career as a child actress. She made her début in films in the Rajinikanth starer and superhit Baasha and then acted in the Sarath Kumar starer Suryavamsam. Her first Tamil serial was when she  played the role of Baby Kaveri in Chithi.

Television

Filmography

References

Tamil television actresses
Actresses in Tamil television
Tamil television presenters
20th-century Indian actresses
21st-century Indian actresses
Actresses in Tamil cinema
Indian film actresses
Living people
Year of birth missing (living people)
Child actresses in Tamil cinema
Indian child actresses
Tamil actresses
Indian television actresses
Indian women television presenters